Paw Paw Township is a civil township of Van Buren County in the U.S. state of Michigan. The population was 7,091 at the 2000 census. The village of Paw Paw is located in the northeast portion of the township. The east south and south branches of the Paw Paw River flow through the township.

Geography

Demographics
As of the census of 2000, there were 7,091 people, 2,771 households, and 1,898 families residing in the township. The racial makeup of the township was 93.60% White, 2.43% African American, 0.87% Native American, 0.27% Asian, 0.03% Pacific Islander, 0.94% from other races, and 1.86% from two or more races. Hispanic or Latino of any race were 3.47% of the population.

There were 2,771 households, out of which 32.7% had children under the age of 18 living with them, 52.6% were married couples living together, 12.0% had a female householder with no husband present, and 31.5% were non-families. 26.0% of all households were made up of individuals, and 9.6% had someone living alone who was 65 years of age or older.  The average household size was 2.49 and the average family size was 2.98.

In the township the population was spread out, with 25.9% under the age of 18, 8.4% from 18 to 24, 27.9% from 25 to 44, 24.6% from 45 to 64, and 13.2% who were 65 years of age or older.  The median age was 38 years. For every 100 females, there were 97.4 males.  For every 100 females age 18 and over, there were 93.3 males.

The median income for a household in the township was $43,802, and the median income for a family was $53,722. Males had a median income of $38,171 versus $28,472 for females. The per capita income for the township was $20,549.  About 4.3% of families and 7.0% of the population were below the poverty line, including 7.5% of those under age 18 and 6.2% of those age 65 or over.

Recycling
The township maintains a transfer station on West Red Arrow Hwy.  Recycles accepted in a newsprint shed, cardboard bin, mixed plastic-glass-metal bin and larger metals bin.

References

Townships in Van Buren County, Michigan
Kalamazoo–Portage metropolitan area
Townships in Michigan